American singer Michael Jackson (1958–2009) released 10 studio albums, 3 soundtrack albums, 1 live album, 39 compilation albums, 10 video albums and 8 remix albums. Since his death, 2 albums of unreleased tracks have been posthumously released. Jackson made his debut in 1964 at the age of five with The Jackson 5 (later known as The Jacksons), who were prominent performers during the 1970s. Jackson is one of the best-selling music artists in history with over 1 billion records sold worldwide. According to the Recording Industry Association of America (RIAA), Jackson has sold 89 million certified albums in the United States, making him the sixth top-selling album artist in the country.

In 1972, Jackson released his debut studio album Got to Be There through Motown Records, while still part of The Jackson 5. It peaked at number 14 on the US Billboard Top LPs & Tapes chart and was certified Gold by the RIAA. The same year, he released another album, Ben, which peaked at number five on the Billboard Top LPs & Tapes chart and was certified Silver by the British Phonographic Industry. The album's title track was a commercial success on the music charts, topping both the US and the Australian ARIA charts, giving Jackson his first number 1 single on the Billboard Hot 100 as a solo artist. Jackson's next two studio albums were Music & Me (1973) and Forever, Michael (1975). In 1975, Jackson signed to Epic Records, and released his fifth studio album, Off the Wall, in 1979. It peaked at number three on the Billboard Top LPs & Tapes chart and spawned two number-one singles on the Billboard Hot 100 in the United States. Off The Wall made Jackson the first solo artist to have four singles from the same album peak in the top 10 on the Billboard Hot 100. The album was certified 9× Platinum by the RIAA and has sold over 20 million copies worldwide, making it one of the best-selling albums of all time. At the 1980 Grammy Awards, it was nominated for two awards, with Jackson winning Best R&B Vocal Performance, Male.

Jackson's sixth studio album, Thriller, was released in 1982. It became his first number one album on the Billboard Top LPs & Tapes chart. Thriller spent a record 37 non-consecutive weeks at number one, from February 26, 1983, to April 14, 1984. Seven singles were released and all reached the top 10 on the Billboard Hot 100 chart. This feat set the record for the most top 10 singles from an album, with "Beat It" and "Billie Jean" reaching number one. It was the best-selling album worldwide in 1983 and was also the first to become the best-selling album in the United States for two years, in 1983 and 1984. The album broke racial barriers in popular music, enabling Jackson's appearances on MTV and meeting with US President Ronald Reagan at the White House. The album set the standard for the music industry with its music videos, and promotion strategies. It influenced artists, record labels, producers, marketers, and choreographers. Thriller was certified 34× Platinum by the RIAA and remains the best-selling album of all time, with sales of 70 million copies worldwide. It won a record-breaking eight awards at the 1984 Grammy Awards (where it won Album of the Year) and the 1984 American Music Awards. In 1987, Jackson released his seventh studio album, Bad. It debuted at number one on the Billboard Top Pop Albums chart in the US. The album also reached number one in 25 other countries. Seven singles charted in the top 20 of the Billboard Hot 100, including a record-breaking five number one singles. With a certification of 11× Platinum by the RIAA and sales of over 35 million copies worldwide, Bad is one of the best-selling albums of all time.

Jackson entered the 1990s with the release of his eighth studio album, Dangerous, in 1991. The album was Jackson's first since Forever, Michael to not be produced by longtime collaborator Quincy Jones. Dangerous debuted at number one on the U.S. Billboard Top Pop Albums chart and in thirteen other countries. The album sold five million copies worldwide in its first week and was the best-selling album worldwide of 1992. Dangerous was certified 8× Platinum by the RIAA and is one of the best-selling albums of all time having sold over 32 million copies worldwide. Jackson's ninth studio album HIStory (1995) debuted at number one on the U.S. Billboard 200, along with nineteen other countries. The album was certified 8× Platinum by the RIAA and has sold over 20 million copies worldwide, making it one of the best-selling albums of all time. Jackson released his remix album Blood on the Dance Floor: HIStory in the Mix in 1997. It has sold over six million copies worldwide, making it the best-selling remix album of all time. Jackson's tenth and final studio album, Invincible, was released in 2001 and topped international charts, with total confirmed sales of 8 million copies worldwide. Following Jackson's death in 2009, sales of his previous work soared, with his compilation albums Number Ones (2003) and The Essential Michael Jackson (2005) becoming the first catalog albums to outsell any new album and becoming international best-sellers. These two were later certified 5× times Platinum by the RIAA. Following the surge in sales, in March 2010, Sony Music signed a $250 million deal with the Jackson estate to extend their distribution rights to Jackson's back catalog until at least 2017. As part of this deal, two posthumous albums of previously unreleased tracks were released: Michael (2010) and Xscape (2014). In 2017, Sony renews their deal for $250 million that went into effect in January 2018.

Studio albums

Compilation albums

In the United States, between May 25, 1991 and November 25, 2009, catalog albums (albums at least 18 months old which have fallen below No. 100 on the Billboard 200 chart and do not have an active single on the Billboard radio charts) were not eligible to chart on the Billboard 200, but could only chart on the Top Catalog Albums, so between November 20, 2003 and November 25, 2009, Billboard launched the Top Comprehensive Albums chart that included current and catalog albums. The following albums appeared on this chart while not eligible for the Billboard 200: Number Ones (#1), The Essential Michael Jackson (#2), Greatest Hits: HIStory, Volume 1 (#28), The Ultimate Collection (#32), 7 CD Mega Bundle (#78), The Definitive Collection (#43), The Stripped Mixes (#67), Selections from Michael Jackson's This Is It (#102) and Gold (#166).

Soundtrack albums

Remix albums

Reissues

Box sets

Video albums

See also
Michael Jackson singles discography
Michael Jackson videography
The Jackson 5 discography
List of best-selling albums

References

Discography, albums
Pop music discographies
Discographies of American artists
Rhythm and blues discographies